Carlos Andrés Muñoz Rojas (born 21 April 1989) is a Chilean footballer that plays for Santiago Wanderers as a striker.

Club career
In 2006, Muñoz was promoted to first–team of Santiago Wanderers, a club he had been a part of since he was five years of age. He made two appearances in his first season with the first team. The next year he found more space, become the club's second choice striker for the most part and bagged two goals in 14 appearances. His third year was a further improvement, playing in even more games (18) and scoring three goals. The 2009 was loaned to Unión Quilpué in the Chilean Tercera A. The 2010 season was Carlos Muñoz real breakout season. He was the first choice striker all season and in 34 first team appearances he scored on 17 occasions. His form continued into 2011 and in the first half of the year he scored eight times in 16 appearances.

His form over the last year and a half earned him a move to Colo-Colo in June 2011 who spent US$1.5 million to bring him in.

After scoring 35 times in 74 appearances over two season at Colo-Colo, Muñoz signed for Emirati football club Baniyas.

On second half 2022, he returned to Santiago Wanderers in the Primera B de Chile.

International career
He represented Chile at under-22 level in the 2010 Toulon Tournament, making 4 appearances and scoring 2 goals.

His goals led him to be called up to the Chile national team for the first time early in 2011. He made his international debut in a friendly match against Colombia on March 29, 2011.

International goals

Honours

Individual
 2010 Chilean Primera Division Ideal Team (2): 2010, 2012
 2010 Chilean Primera Division Best Young Player (1): 2010
 2012 Chilean Primera Division Best Player (1): 2012,

References

External links
 

1989 births
Living people
People from Valparaíso
Chilean footballers
Chilean expatriate footballers
Chile international footballers
Chile youth international footballers
Santiago Wanderers footballers
Unión Quilpué footballers
Colo-Colo footballers
Baniyas Club players
Al Ahli Club (Dubai) players
Talleres de Córdoba footballers
Unión Española footballers
Cobresal footballers
C.D. Antofagasta footballers
O'Higgins F.C. footballers
Chilean Primera División players
Tercera División de Chile players
UAE Pro League players
Argentine Primera División players
Primera B de Chile players
Sportspeople from Valparaíso
Association football forwards
2011 Copa América players
Expatriate footballers in the United Arab Emirates
Expatriate footballers in Argentina
Chilean expatriate sportspeople in the United Arab Emirates
Chilean expatriate sportspeople in Argentina
Outfield association footballers who played in goal